Fidel Castro Handbook is a 2006 book by British politician George Galloway. Galloway describes himself as "a partisan for Cuba, for the revolution, for the leadership'". The book details a history of Cuba since the revolution and the supposed progress made despite sanctions from the United States. The book was launched at Portcullis House, Westminster, London.

Reception
Whilst the book received some praise on the left it was criticised by Workers' Liberty for being "a hagiography about one of the last grand Stalinist autocrats by one of its most loquacious apologists". According to John Harris of The Guardian, the book is evidence of Galloway's "singular politics".

References

2006 non-fiction books
Books about Cuba
Books about foreign relations of the United States
Fidel Castro
Books critical of capitalism
Books by George Galloway